Lopholatilus ereborensis is an extinct species of tilefish found in formations at Calvert Cliffs State Park in Lusby, Maryland. The species lived in the Salisbury Embayment in the Western North Atlantic during the Miocene era, 16 million years ago. The species is believed to have dug long, funnel-shaped vertical burrows in the continental shelf, the collapse of which may account for the remarkable preservation of the fossils. The name is derived from "Erebor", the Elvish name for the Lonely Mountain from J.R.R. Tolkien's The Hobbit.

References

ereborensis
Fossil taxa described in 2014
Paleontology in Maryland
Organisms named after Tolkien and his works